Heartland Media, LLC is an American media company that owns television stations in smaller markets in the United States. The company is based in Atlanta, Georgia. It operates the television broadcasting companies, USA Television Holdings, LLC and  USA Television MidAmerica Holdings, LLC (together USA TV) as a joint venture alongside MSouth Equity Partners. The company is run by Bob Prather, a former CEO of Gray Television, whose philosophy of station acquisitions, acquired during his time at Gray, is centered on "acquiring No. 1-rated stations, Big Four affiliates with strong local news operations targeting university towns and state capitols that are deeply ingrained in the fabric of their communities".

History 
Heartland Media made its first acquisition in September 2013, when it acquired NBC affiliate WKTV in Utica, New York from Smith Media, which was the company's remaining television property. This was followed by the 2014 acquisition of Oregon-based Chambers Communications and its stations, KEZI in Eugene  and KDRV in Medford, as well as the latter's satellite station in Klamath Falls, KDKF. Later that year, Heartland and MSouth Equity Partners also acquired NBC affiliate WTVA in Tupelo, Mississippi from the Spain family, along with WTVA's shared services agreement with West Point-based Fox affiliate WLOV-TV (owned by Coastal Television).

In 2015, US Television Holdings would acquire CBS affiliate KHSL-TV in Chico, California from GOCOM Media, LLC, in a deal that also concurrently saw the station's LMA partner, NBC affiliate KNVN, sold by K4 Media Holdings to Maxair Media, LLC, with KHSL selling up to 15 percent of KNVN's advertising time.

On August 26, 2016, Hartland agreed to acquire ABC affiliate WAAY-TV in Huntsville, Alabama from Calkins Media, as that company sold the rest of its television stations to Raycom Media, who already owned WAFF in the market. The sale closed on May 1, 2017.

On June 13, 2016, USA Television MidAmerica Holdings, a Heartland Media and MSouth Equity Partners, announced its acquisition of five small-market stations owned by Nexstar Broadcasting Group and Media General for $115 million. The stations were sold to allow Nexstar to comply with FCC ownership rules as part of its acquisition of Media General, particularly in regards to national market coverage and rules forbidding duopolies in these markets, which are among the smallest in the United States. The deal was consummated upon the approval of Nexstar's merger with Media General on January 17.

On October 1, 2019, Allen Media Broadcasting, a subsidiary of Entertainment Studios, announced that it would acquire 11 of USA TV's stations for $290 million. Heartland management would continue to manage the stations. The sale was approved by the FCC on November 22, 2019.

Television stations 
Stations are arranged in alphabetical order by state and city of license.

Note:
 (##) - Indicates stations that were previously owned by Chambers Communications, prior to its acquisition by Heartland in 2016.
 (§§) - Indicates stations that were acquired by Heartland as divestitures from Nexstar's acquisition of Media General in 2017.

Current

Former

Other Notes:
1 Owned by Maxair Media, LLC. Heartland operates the station under a shared services agreement (SSA).
2 Owned by Coastal Television Broadcasting Company LLC. Heartland operates the station under a shared services agreement.

References

External links 
 

 
Television broadcasting companies of the United States
Mass media companies established in 2014
American companies established in 2014
Companies based in Atlanta